Tru Confessions is the first novel by children’s book author Janet Tashjian. It is published by Henry Holt and Company; the paperback is published by Square Fish, an imprint of Macmillan.  The novel is written in a format of a diary inputted on a computer and uses lists and illustrations.

The novel has been translated into several languages and was adapted into a 2002 Disney Channel Original Movie of the same name starring Clara Bryant and Shia LaBeouf.

Plot 
Trudy is a twelve-year-old girl who both wants to have her own television show and ‘cure’ her developmentally delayed brother Eddie.

Reception and awards 
The novel received positive reviews. Publishers Weekly in their starred review praises the truthful reflection of the experience of having a mentally-impaired sibling and unique digital diary format and states “Middle-graders will laugh their way through Tru’s poignant and clever take on everyday life”. Kirkus Reviews' review praised the characters and plot.

The novel was named a New York Public Library Book for the Teen Age, a Bank Street College of Education Best Children’s Book of the Year, and a Women's National Book Association Judy Lopez Memorial Honor Book, won the Dolly Gray Children's Literature Award, and nominated for the Massachusetts Children's Book Award on the Master List.

References 

 https://us.macmillan.com/books/9780312372736

1997 American novels
American children's novels
American novels adapted into films
Henry Holt and Company books
1997 children's books
Fictional diaries
Twins in fiction
Disability in fiction